King of Hell or The King of Hell may refer to:

King of Hell (comics), a manhwa (Korean comics)
Yama (East Asia), sometimes known as the "King of Hell"
The King of Hell, 2008 album by Helstar
King of Hell, 2014 novel in The Shadow Saga series by Christopher Golden
Simon Luttrell, 1st Earl of Carhampton, nicknamed "King of Hell"
Crowley (Supernatural), a fictional character from Supernatural, who held the title "King of Hell"
Asmodeus (Dungeons & Dragons), a fictional character from Dungeons & Dragons, whose title is "King of Hell"

See also
 King ov Hell (born 1974), Norwegian musician
 King Hell Press
 The Devil, the Lord of Hell
 Hel (being), ruler of Hel in Norse mythology